G.O.D. (Gold, Oil & Diamonds) is a retail mixtape by rapper AZ. It was released on June 30, 2009 through Siccness.net. Due to scheduling conflicts with another label and close similarities in the album names, Sicness.net released AZ's second album of 2009, which was previously titled I Am Legend.

Track listing

References

2009 mixtape albums
AZ (rapper) albums